Standing is an English surname. Notable people with the surname include:

Colin Standing, Welsh rugby league player
David Standing (born 1963), English cricketer
George Standing (born 1941), Canadian ice hockey player
Guy Standing (1873–1937), English actor
Guy Standing (economist) (born 1948), British economist
Herbert Standing (1846–1923), English actor
Herbert F. Standing, paleontologist and missionary
Jack Standing (1886–1917), English actor
Joan Standing (1903–1979), English actress
John Standing (born 1934), English actor
Joseph Standing (1854–1879), American Mormon missionary
Michael Standing (actor) (born 1939), English actor
Michael Standing (footballer) (born 1981), English footballer
Percy Standing (1882–1950), English actor
Richard Standing, English actor
William Standing (1904-1951), American painter and illustrator
Wyndham Standing (1880–1963), English actor

See also
Standring

English-language surnames